Ulvo is a surname. Notable people with the surname include:

Andreas Ulvo (born 1983), Norwegian jazz pianist, organist, keyboardist, and composer
Therese Birkelund Ulvo (born 1982), Norwegian composer and producer

Norwegian-language surnames